Emil Martonffy (1904–1983) was a Hungarian screenwriter and film director.

Selected filmography
Director
  Márciusi mese (1934)
  Pogányok (1937)
  Rézi Friday (1938)
  Rozmaring (1938)
 Duel for Nothing (1940)
 Shako and Hat (1941)
 Szabotázs (1942)
  A Lover of the Theatre (1944)

Bibliography
 Cunningham, John. Hungarian Cinema: From Coffee House to Multiplex. Wallflower Press, 2004.

External links

1904 births
1983 deaths
Male screenwriters
Hungarian male writers
Hungarian film directors
Writers from Budapest
20th-century Hungarian screenwriters